A nip-up is an acrobatic spring from a supine position (lying horizontally, facing upward) to a standing position. It is executed by propelling the body away from the floor so that the performer is momentarily airborne, and typically ends with the performer standing in a squatting position. It is performed in a variety of activities, including acro dance, breakdancing, gymnastics, martial arts, professional wrestling, parkour and freerunning.

Execution and physics

Nip-ups depend in large part on developing momentum in the legs and then using that momentum to lift the body into the air. A nip-up begins with the performer rolling back onto the shoulders while drawing both legs toward the chest. The legs may be either straight or bent, and hands may optionally be placed on the floor near the ears. The legs are then rapidly thrust away from body trunk and floor while simultaneously pushing away from the floor with hands, if used.

During the thrust, the acceleration of leg mass away from the floor develops upward linear momentum in the legs. At the same time, the acceleration of the angular expansion between legs and trunk develops angular momentum in the legs. When the thrust is completed, movement of the legs with respect to the trunk ceases suddenly and, as a result, the linear and angular momentum of the legs are transferred to the entire body.

The linear momentum of the thrust carries the body into the air feet first, while the angular momentum causes the airborne body to rotate in a face-first direction. The back is arched so that with sufficient thrust, back curvature, and body rotation, the performer will be carried into the air and land on the feet.

See also
Kip up

References

Breakdance moves
Gymnastics elements
Martial art techniques
Acro dance moves
Squatting position